The Next Best Thing is a 2000 American comedy-drama film directed by John Schlesinger (his final feature film before his death in 2003) about two best friends who have a child together and a custody battle years after. Starring Madonna, Rupert Everett, and Benjamin Bratt, it opened to the number-two position in the North American box office and poor critical reviews.

Plot

Two best friendsAbbie, a heterosexual woman, and Robert, a gay man decide to have a child together. Five years later, Abbie falls in love with a heterosexual man and wants to move away with him and Robert's son Sam, and a nasty custody battle ensues.

Cast
 Madonna as Abigail "Abbie" Reynolds
 Rupert Everett as Robert Whittaker
 Benjamin Bratt as Benjamin "Ben" Cooper
 Michael Vartan as Kevin Lasater
 Josef Sommer as Richard Whittaker
 Lynn Redgrave as Helen Whittaker
 Malcolm Stumpf as Samuel "Sam"
 Neil Patrick Harris as David
 Illeana Douglas as Elizabeth Ryder
 Mark Valley as Cardiologist
 Suzanne Krull as Annabel
 Stacy Edwards as Finn
 William Mesnik as Ashby
 Linda Larkin as Kelly
 Adam Marlow as Baby

Production
The film began as an original screenplay titled The Red Curtain by Tom Ropelewski, which he intended to direct, with his wife Leslie Dixon to produce. It was announced to be made in 1995 with Richard Dreyfuss attached to star as Robert; he dropped out, then Helen Hunt was named as female lead to play Abbie. She was replaced by Madonna and then Rupert Everett signed on as star. Filming took place between April 23 and June 30, 1999. It later was claimed the script was rewritten extensively by Ryan Murphy and Rupert Everett.

Reception

Critical response
The film received a 19% approval rating on Rotten Tomatoes, based on 94 reviews, with an average rating of 3.8/10. The website's critical consensus states: "Story elements clash and acting falls short." On Metacritic, the film has rating of 25 out of 100 based on 31 reviews, indicating "generally unfavorable reviews".

Roger Ebert gave the film one star out of four, stating: "The Next Best Thing is a garage sale of gay issues, harnessed to a plot as exhausted as a junkman's horse."

Box office
The film opened at number two at the North American box office, making USD$5,870,387, behind The Whole Nine Yards. The film grossed $14,990,582 in the U.S. and $24,362,772 worldwide on a $25 million budget.

Accolades
The film was nominated as Outstanding Film at the 2001 GLAAD Media Awards.

Madonna won a Golden Raspberry Award for Worst Actress, and the film was nominated for other Razzies including:
 Worst Director – John Schlesinger
 Worst Picture
 Worst Screenplay – Thomas Ropelewski
 Worst Screen Couple – Madonna and either Rupert Everett or Benjamin Bratt

Soundtrack

The soundtrack album was released by Maverick Records on February 21, 2000. It reached number 34 on the US Billboard 200 albums chart. Madonna was executive producer on the soundtrack and hand-picked all the tracks that appeared. The album had two new songs from Madonna: "Time Stood Still" (an original track written and produced with William Orbit) and a cover of Don McLean's "American Pie". "Time Stood Still" reached the number 3 in Czech Republic, and the latter track was a number one around the world, climbing to the top of the charts in the UK, Italy, Australia, Germany, and Japan. The album also included tracks by Moby, Beth Orton, Christina Aguilera, and Groove Armada.

Track listing
 "Boom Boom Ba" – Métisse
 "Bongo Bong" – Manu Chao
 "Don't Make Me Love You ('Til I'm Ready)" – Christina Aguilera
 "American Pie" – Madonna
 "This Life" – Mandalay
 "If Everybody Looked the Same" – Groove Armada
 "Why Does My Heart Feel So Bad?" – Moby
 "I'm Not in Love" – Olive
 "Stars All Seem to Weep" – Beth Orton
 "Time Stood Still" – Madonna
 "Swayambhu" – Solar Twins
 "Forever and Always" – Gabriel Yared

Charts

See also
 List of lesbian, gay, bisexual, or transgender-related films by storyline

References

External links
 
 
 
 
 

2000 films
2000 comedy-drama films
2000 LGBT-related films
American comedy-drama films
American LGBT-related films
American pregnancy films
2000s English-language films
Films directed by John Schlesinger
Films produced by Gary Lucchesi
Films produced by Tom Rosenberg
Films set in California
Films scored by Gabriel Yared
Gay-related films
Golden Raspberry Award winning films
Lakeshore Entertainment films
LGBT-related comedy-drama films
Paramount Pictures films
2000s American films
English-language comedy-drama films